The Third Page is a 1999 Turkish drama film directed by Zeki Demirkubuz and starring Başak Köklükaya and Ruhi Sarı.

Cast 
 Başak Köklükaya - Meryem
 Ruhi Sarı - Isa Demirci
 Cengiz Sezici - House-Owner
 Serdar Orçin - House-Owner's Son

References

External links 

1999 drama films
1999 films
Turkish drama films